What Do Pretty Girls Do? is a live compilation album by British singer-songwriter Kirsty MacColl, released by Hux Records in 1998. The compilation features fifteen tracks recorded across four BBC Radio One sessions between 1989 and 1995.

Tracks 1–4 were recorded for Nicky Campbell in 1989 and tracks 5–8 also recorded for Campbell in 1991. "Darling, Let's Have Another Baby" and "A New England" of the latter session features Billy Bragg. Tracks 9-11 were recorded for Simon Mayo in 1994 and tracks 12–15 for Kevin Greening in 1995.

Reception

Chris Woodstra of AllMusic wrote: "BBC sets are always fun for fans, but for an artist like MacColl, who has always shyed away from live performance and whose albums have always been meticulously produced, this one is particularly revealing. She sounds relaxed and, the sheer quality of the songs (and her voice) is made even more apparent in this straightforward, no-frills setting." Ben Varkentine of PopMatters commented: "Some of the songs are given small-backing group treatments that should force even longtime fans to reconsider just how good a songwriter she was. Stripped of MacColl's trademark backing vocal tricks or any production polish, the songs must get by on their own. And do they, oh man, do they."

Track listing

Personnel
Musicians
 Kirsty MacColl – vocals
 Phil Rambow – acoustic guitar
 Martin Belmont – guitar
 Pete Glenister – guitar
 Bobby Valentine – violin
 Gavin Povey – piano
 Paul Riley – bass guitar
 Pete Thomas – drums
 Billy Bragg – vocals, guitar (tracks 7–8)
 Lu Edwards – bouzouki
 Simon Edwards – bass guitar
 Mark Nevin – guitar
 Dave Ruffy – bongos
 Segs – bass, percussion

Production
 Peter Watts – producer (tracks 1–8)
 Martyn Parker – engineering (tracks 1–8)
 Chris Whatmough – producer (tracks 12–15)

Other
 Charles Dickens – photography
 Neil at 9th Planet, London – design

References

Kirsty MacColl albums
1998 compilation albums
Hux Records albums